Novaci can refer to:

 Novaci, Romania, a town in Gorj County, Oltenia, Romania
 Novaci, a village in Mihăilești town, Giurgiu County, Romania
 Novaci, a village in Tuzara Commune, Călăraşi district, Moldova
 Novaci, North Macedonia, a village in North Macedonia
 Novaci Municipality, a municipality in North Macedonia
 Novaci (Ub), a village in Ub municipality, Serbia

See also 
 Novac (disambiguation)
 Novak